Tongren is a prefecture-level city in Guizhou province, China.

Tongren may also refer to:

Tongren, Qinghai, a county-level city of Huangnan Tibetan Autonomous Prefecture
Bijiang District, formerly the county-level Tongren City, now a district of Tongren, Guizhou

Tong Ren may refer to:
Hexagram 13 of the I Ching
Tong Ren therapy, a kind of putative energy medicine

See also

Doujin
Tong Ren Tang, Chinese pharmaceutical company founded in 1669
Tongeren, Belgium